Ghetto Love EP is the debut musical release from Spinnerette. It was released digitally in late 2008 through their website and Topspin Media. The EP contains four main tracks as well as a teaser mix of Spinnerette material and the music video for "Ghetto Love" (directed by Liam Lynch). "Ghetto Love" and "Distorting a Code" are also featured on their self-titled album.

Track listing
"Ghetto Love" – 3:38
"Valium Knights" – 2:27
"Distorting a Code" – 4:10
"Bury My Heart" – 3:04

References

2008 debut EPs
Anthem Records EPs
Spinnerette albums